Ratu Alivereti Raka  (born 9 December 1994) is a Fijian born rugby union player who plays for the France national rugby union team. He played wing for Nadroga and now for French Top 14 side Clermont.

Early life and career
Raka was born in Nakorovatu, Naitasiri, he studied at Waimala Secondary School. He played age grade rugby for Nadroga in the u16 and u20 grade before joining the main Nadroga team in 2014. He played 7's rugby for local side Tovolea before joining champion side Daveta in 2014. He made his debut for Nadroga in October 2014 against Vatukoula in the Skipper Cup scoring a try on debut.

Clermont
Raka joined the ASM Clermont academy in November 2014 as part of a memorandum between Nadroga Rugby and ASM Clermont. He joined other players that had joined the academy such as Peceli Yato and Uwa Tuwalo.

Raka was selected into the main Clermont side for the 2015–16 Top 14 season. On September 5, he made his debut against Oyonnax Rugby off the bench and scored a try.

In March 2016, Raka scored 2 brilliant tries against Stade Toulousain. He has scored 5 tries in 6 games since his debut.

Raka played in the 2016–17 Top 14 Final after an injury ruled out Noa Nakaitaci and he scored Clermont's only try in the first half helping them to win the Final.

In September 2017, his contract with Clermont was extended by three more years.

International career

International tries

Trivia
His surname "Raka" is the Fijian word for Rugby.

References

External links
 France profile at FFR
 ASM Clermont profile
 ITSRUGBY Profile

1994 births
Living people
People from Naitasiri Province
Fijian rugby union players
French rugby union players
France international rugby union players
French people of Fijian descent
Fijian expatriate rugby union players
Expatriate rugby union players in France
Rugby union wings
Fijian expatriate sportspeople in France
ASM Clermont Auvergne players
I-Taukei Fijian people